The Body, the Blood, the Machine is the third studio album by American indie rock band The Thermals. The album was released on August 22, 2006, on Sub Pop Records, and was produced by Fugazi's Brendan Canty. According to the band's official website, "the album tells the story of a young couple who must flee a United States governed by fascist faux-Christians."

Reception 

The music review online magazine Pitchfork placed The Body, the Blood, the Machine at number 186 on their list of top 200 albums of the 2000s.

Track listing
All songs written and arranged by Hutch Harris and Kathy Foster.

Credits
 Produced by Brendan Canty
 Recorded at Supernatural Sound, Oregon City, Oregon
 Assisted by Pete Tewes
 Mixed by Frank Marchand III at Waterford Digital, Baltimore, Maryland
 Mastered by Roger Seibel at SAE Mastering, Phoenix, Arizona
 Design by The Thermals with help from Dusty Summers
 Jesus painting by Jon Daly

References

2006 albums
The Thermals albums
Sub Pop albums